Nii Addy is an American neuroscientist who is an Associate Professor of Psychiatry at the Yale School of Medicine. His research considers the neurobiological basis of substance use disorders, depression, and anxiety. He has worked on various initiatives to mitigate tobacco use and addiction.

Early life and education 
Addy earned his bachelor's degree at Duke University in 2000. He moved to Yale University for his doctoral studies, and graduated in 2010.

Research and career 
After earning his doctoral degree Addy was appointed to the faculty at the Yale School of Medicine. At Yale School of Medicine Addy leads a laboratory investigating the mechanisms of reinforcement learning and motivational control. He has investigated the impact of vaping on teenager's brains.

Selected publications

References 

Living people
Year of birth missing (living people)
Duke University alumni
Yale School of Medicine alumni
Yale School of Medicine faculty
21st-century African-American scientists
American neuroscientists